The Supercopa de España de Baloncesto 2015 is the 12th edition of the tournament since it is organized by the ACB and the 16th overall. It is also called Supercopa Endesa for sponsorship reasons.

It will be played in the Palacio de Deportes José María Martín Carpena in Málaga on 2 and 3 October. After the 2004 and 2006 editions, this will be the third Supercopa at the Andalusian city.

Participant teams
The ACB board confirmed the participants on 22 June 2015 and they were drawn on 23 September.

Semifinals

Herbalife Gran Canaria vs. FC Barcelona Lassa

Unicaja vs. Real Madrid

Final

References

External links
 Official website

Supercopa de España de Baloncesto
C